William de Remmyngton (also Remmington) was an English medieval monk and university chancellor.

William de Remmyngton was a Cistercian monk at Sawley Abbey, then in the West Riding of Yorkshire. He was  Chancellor of the University of Oxford between 1372 and 1373. He was opposed to John Wycliffe at Oxford.

References

Year of birth unknown
Year of death unknown
People from Craven District
People from Ribble Valley (district)
English Cistercians
Chancellors of the University of Oxford
14th-century English people